John Sessions' Tall Tales was a British comedy written by and starring John Sessions.

The show was commissioned as a result of John Sessions' reputation for improvisation, having been a pivotal figure in the success of Whose Line Is It Anyway?, and was intended as 6 half-hour comic plays, to be penned by Sessions, but rooted in improvisation. All 6 episodes of John Sessions' Tall Tales were produced and directed by Geoff Posner for Pozzitive Television.

References

1991 British television series debuts
1991 British television series endings
1990s British comedy television series
BBC television comedy
British comedy television shows
English-language television shows